Trill and B is a studio album by American rapper Skrizzy which was released on 20 June 2016 via iTunes.

Background
On 28 December 2015, Skrizzy organized a listening party of the album at DJ Carisma's studio where he performed few songs. He revealed to have trimmed 300 recorded songs to release the 18-track album. Preceding the album's release were two lead singles "Main Ting" and "Better Work for It" which garnered over 5 million streams on Spotify upon its release.

Critical reception
The album was released to positive reception among music critics. Jake Mayo of RESPECT. was impressed with the over-all musical composition and further went on to state that, "Regardless whether Skrizzy’s is spitting bars of hitting falsettos, the album impresses across the board, positioning him as one of the new wave's most formidable shapers."

Track listing

Personnel
Musicians
Carlon – featured artist
Yung – featured artist
Morning Afta – featured artist
Ricoche – featured artist
Jaida – featured artist
Carlos – featured artist
Sean Bradbury – featured artist

Production

Joey Magic – recording and mixing engineer
Fred Nice – production (track 1)
Kydd Strumentals – production (track 2, 5)
Lokey – production (track 3)
Zaire – production (track 4, 11, 17)
Dope Boi Beatz - production (track 6)
Pdub the Producer – production (track 7)
Flash Beats – production (track 8)
Mindsweeper – production (track 10)
Scott Supreme – production (track 12)
Paul Cabbin – production (track 13)
Dee Money – production (track 14)
Chapo – production (track 14)
Scott Supreme – production (track 15)
ItsDG – production (track 16)
Jacob Lethal – production (track 18)

Release history

References

2016 debut albums
Young Scrap albums